The American Lumber Standard Committee (ALSC) is a 501(c)(3) nonprofit organization.

History
The Central Committee on Lumber Standards was started in 1922 by Herbert Hoover when he was U.S. Secretary of Commerce at the request of the lumber industry. Chaired by John W. Blodgett, the Central Committee was intended to be a way to create voluntary lumber standards without imposing formal government regulations, in order to solve the problem of lumber manufacturers selling lumber that was not actually as thick as the lumber was marketed as being. The Central Committee collected information before establishing its standards. In 1924, the Central Committee developed standard that described lumber sizes, methodology for assigning design values, nomenclature, and inspection procedures. Several decades later, the American Lumber Standard Committee succeeded the Central Committee. The ALSC supervises and creates grading standards and standard patterns of softwood lumber.

In the early 20th century, lumber sold as 1-inch thick was milled to about 7/8 inch. Around World War I, the standard for a 1-inch board was changed to a thickness of 13/16 inch. In 1929, the standard for 1-inch lumber was changed to 25/32 inch. As of 1963, 1-inch lumber had a standard thickness of 3/4 inch.

References

Non-profit organizations based in Maryland
Organizations established in 1922